The BMW Car Club of America (BMW CCA) is a U.S.-based organization of enthusiasts and owners of BMW-made automobiles (including MINI). Organized into five regions and 69 chapters, the club boasts more than 55,000 active members within the United States, making it the largest BMW owner/enthusiast organization in the world. The BMW CCA arranges a wide variety of social, technical and driving events, including autocross, high-performance driver's education, rallies, club racing and owner education on topics such as mechanical repair, automotive maintenance and collecting vintage vehicles.

History and structure
Founded in Boston in 1969, the organization began as an owner-support network, the club exists as a separate entity from BMW AG and its North American subsidiary, although there is a close working relationship, such as discounts on vehicles and parts provided to club members by the company. Currently headquartered at 2350 Highway 101 South Greer, SC, the BMW CCA is a not-for-profit corporation, governed by an elected board of directors that meets quarterly. Five Regional Vice Presidents, who serve on the board, represent the interests of the chapters. Each chapter is an independent corporation chartered by BMW CCA and operates within with minimum standards of service to the membership. All chapters are geographically based except for the E30 and E31 Chapters, which are non-geographic model-specific chapters.

Past Locations
 PO Box 99 at the Prudential Center, Boston MA (Jul 1969)
 2 Brewer Street, Cambridge, MA (Dec 1974)
 345 Harvard Street, Cambridge, MA (Jul 1978)
 640 South Main Street, Suite 201 Greenville, SC (2001)

BMW CCA Foundation
In March 2002, the BMW CCA formed the 501(c)(3) BMW CCA Foundation. This charity is dedicated to preserving the history of the BMW marque in the U.S., the club's history and to fund and operates a Teen Driver Safety School Program, known as Street Survival. The Foundation operates a car museum and archive building adjacent to the BMW Manufacturing Plant and BMW Performance Center in Greer, South Carolina.

The Street Survival program is aimed at teaching young American drivers, age 15-21 the importance of safe driving through emergency and accident avoidance training conducted in their own cars by qualified volunteers and professionals. Since 2002, over 1000 Street Survival Schools have been conducted in the United States and Canada.

Publications

Roundel 
Roundel is the club's national, monthly magazine. More akin to mainstream automotive periodicals than a newsletter, Roundel covers the history of the BMW marque, reviews current models and trends, offers articles on vehicle modification and maintenance, coverage of the organization's club races and columns by notable authors, racing drivers and club officials. Local BMW CCA chapters publish newsletters to inform members about upcoming events.

BimmerLife 
BimmerLife is the BMW CCA's public-facing online news site, sharing stories about the BMW community. BimmerLife covers BMW news, motorsports, events (both CCA and non-CCA) as well as general interest articles from the BMW community as a whole. While some content is user submitted, BimmerLife also has recurring articles from columnists such as The Hack Mechanic: Rob Siegel.

National programs

Oktoberfest
Each year the club hosts a week-long event, Oktoberfest, a national club gathering, that includes non-speed competitive driving events, a wide variety of technical sessions, vendor displays and presentations, as well as plenty of socializing with fellow BMW enthusiasts.

The first BMW CCA Oktoberfest was held in 1970 in Concord, Massachusetts. Since then, the annual gathering of the Club has been held every year. Here are the Oktoberfest locations and the years:

 1970   Concord, MA
 1971   Washington, DC (New Carrollton, MD)
 1972   Virginia Beach, VA
 1973   Atlantic City, NJ
 1974   Waterbury, CT
 1975   Alpine Valley, WI
 1976   Washington, DC (Silver Spring, MD)
 1977   San Mateo, CA
 1978   Oconomowoc WI
 1979   Danvers, MA
 1980   San Diego, CA
 1981   Milwaukee, WI
 1982   Albany, NY
 1983   Colorado Springs, CO
 1984   Sturbridge, MA
 1985   Monterey, CA
 1986   Orlando, FL
 1987   Tulsa, OK
 1988   Rochester, NY
 1989   Keystone, CO
 1990   Columbus, OH
 1991   Waterbury, CT
 1992   West Palm Beach, FL
 1993   Sonoma Valley, CA
 1994   Andover, MA
 1995   Breckinridge, CO
 1996   Tysons Corner, VA
 1997   Waterville Valley, NH
 1998   Orlando, FL
 1999   Indianapolis, IN
 2000   Spartanburg, SC
 2001   Waterville Valley, NH
 2002   Keystone, CO
 2003   Austin, TX
 2004   Pasadena, CA
 2005   Greensboro, NC
 2006   Grand Rapids, MI
 2007   Fort Worth, TX
 2008   Watkins Glen, NY
 2009   Lake Lanier, GA
 2010   Elkhart Lake, WI
 2011   Birmingham, AL
 2012   Columbus, OH
 2013   Monterey, CA
 2014   Beaver Creek, CO
 2015   Absecon, NJ
 2016   Monterey, CA
 2017   New Orleans, LA
 2018   Pittsburgh, PA
 2019   Greenville, SC

BMW CCA Club Racing
The BMW CCA organizes and oversees the BMW CCA Club Racing series, one of the largest single-marque amateur racing series in the United States. Begun in 1995, BMW CCA Club Racing has grown to nearly 50 races annually, organized by region, with more than a dozen classes for different models and levels of modification.

Techfest
Techfest is not currently an active program. The BMW CCA Techfest was a national three- to four-day gathering of Club members and BMW technical experts and vendors. Techfest presented lectures, panels, and technical instruction workshops aimed at informing BMW owners on advanced repair and maintenance techniques, and also provided a forum for independent service providers and aftermarket vendors to show off their wares and services. Techfest 2003 was held in the Los Angeles, California area. Techfest 2004 was in Reston, Virginia. There was no event in 2005. In 2006, Techfest was hosted in St. Louis, Missouri. The last Techfest was held in 2007 in Tacoma, Washington.

Techfest was the successor to the long-running Gateway Tech, which was held annually by the Saint Louis BMW Club, a BMW CCA chapter, starting in 1982. Although it was presented by the St. Louis chapter and staffed mostly by volunteers from that chapter, and remained a chapter event, Gateway Tech eventually became sanctioned as a regional event by BMW CCA. Gateway Tech was always held in the St. Louis, Missouri area, but attendees came from all over the United States. The last Gateway Tech under that name was held in 2002. For 2006, Gateway Tech's successor event, Techfest, returned the gathering to its roots in St. Louis, Missouri.

References

External links
Official site

Auto racing organizations in the United States
Companies based in Greenville, South Carolina
BMW
Automobile associations in the United States
Car-related mass media